This is a list of members of the New Zealand Parliament who have served for at least 30 years. The time of service is not always continuous and separate terms are aggregated.

A total of 34 individuals have served in excess of 30 years in Parliament. One current member, Trevor Mallard, is included in the list.

Members of Parliament who have served for at least 30 years

Key

†: Died in office

Table footnotes:

See also
 Father of the House (New Zealand)
 List of living former members of the New Zealand Parliament elected earliest
 List of longest-serving members of the Parliament of Australia

Notes

References

Senior legislators
Members of the New Zealand House of Representatives
New Zealand Parliament